Peter Christian Uldahl (1 March 1778 - 1 March 1820) was a Danish piano maker. He started Denmark's first piano factory in Copenhagen in 1809. Just under 600 instruments left the factory during its 11 years of existence. A giraffe piano from the factory is in the collection of the Danish Music Museum.

Early life
Uldahl was born in Assens on the island of Funen as the illegitimate child of maid.Birthe Jørgensdatter. In 1801, he moved to Copenhagen after having completed his apprenticeship as a joiner. Later the same year he left the country to escape military service. In Saint Petersburg, he worked for a musical instrument maker.

Career
After three and a half years in Saint Petersburg, Uldahl continued to Vienna by way of Prague. In Vienna, he started out by working for piano maker  Joseph Wachtl for three and a half years. He then spent  half a year as manager of Brodmansk's piano factory in the same city. He was offered  to take over the factory and was also proposed to settle in London or Riga but eventually decided to return to Denmark. Back in Copenhagen, in June 1809, he immediately started a piano workshop. In January 1810, he was awarded a 5000 rigsdaler loan from the Foundation ad usus publicos for the establishment of a piano factory. By November 1810, he employed 10 craftsmen and an assistant. By 1915, it had increased to 22 craftsmen and three apprentices. One of his early employees was Andreas Marschall, who went on to start his own piano factory in 1812.

Uldahlspecialized in the construction of pyramidic and giraffe pianos. In 1812, he was represented with five different models of pianos on an exhibition hosted by Selskabet for indenlandsk kunstflid. In 1817, he opened a new piano shop, but over the next years he gradually lost his position as the country's leading piano builder. In 1820, he only employed two craftsmen and one boy. The development was both a result of the difficult economic times that followed the Dansih state bankruptcy in 1913 and increased competition from other manudacturers. His models were at the same time considered somewhat outdated. Uldahl died on his birthday in 1820. The factory closed in conkunction with his death.

Personal life
Uldahl was married to Anna Dorothea Hammond, daughter of post master and kancelliråd  Bastian H. (1732-1809) and Anna Dorothea Reiersen (1745-1826). The wedding took place on 23 November 1811 in Holmen Church.

Legacy
Just under 600 pianos left the factory during its 11 years of existence. A giraffe piano from the factory is in the collection of the Danish Music Museum in Copenhagen.

References

Further reading
 Efterretn. fra selsk. for indenlandsk kunstflid 1, 1812 157-60 217f
  Nyrop, Camillus: Bidrag til den da. industris hist., 1873 320-28. 
 Falcon Moller. Dorthe: Danske instrumentbyggere 1770-1850, 1983.

External links

Piano makers
Danish musical instrument makers
19th-century Danish artisans
Artisans from Copenhagen
Danish companies established in 1809
People from Assens Municipality